Carmel Kallemaa (born 8 October 1997) is an Estonian-born Canadian rhythmic gymnast.

Life and career

Kallemaa was born in Tartu, Estonia on 8 October 1997. She moved to Ontario with her family in 2013. Her mother is gymnast .

She represented Canada at the 2019 Pan American Games, in the group competitions, and at the 2022 Pan American Gymnastics Championships where she won bronze medals in the team, individual all-around and clubs events.

She competed at the 2022 Commonwealth Games where she won a gold medal in the team all-around event, a silver medal in the clubs event and bronze medals in the hoop and ribbon events.

References

1997 births
Living people
Canadian rhythmic gymnasts
Estonian emigrants to Canada
Commonwealth Games medallists in gymnastics
Commonwealth Games gold medallists for Canada
Commonwealth Games silver medallists for Canada
Commonwealth Games bronze medallists for Canada
Gymnasts at the 2022 Commonwealth Games
Gymnasts at the 2019 Pan American Games
Pan American Games competitors for Canada
Sportspeople from Tartu
Medallists at the 2022 Commonwealth Games